Grykë-Çajë is a former municipality in Kukës County, Albania. At the 2015 local government reform it became a subdivision of the municipality Kukës. The population at the 2011 census was 1,440. It is located between two rivers that flow into the Black Drin river, at the foot of Mount Korab. Nine Halveti structures lie in the municipality's borders. The municipal unit consists of the following villages:

 Fshat
 Çajë
 Buzëmadhe
 Shkinak

References

Former municipalities in Kukës County
Administrative units of Kukës